Rhinotia haemoptera, the red weevil, is a weevil species in the family Belidae found in Australia. They resemble net-winged beetles (Lycidae) in colour and are thought to mimic them.

References

Belidae
Beetles described in 1819
Beetles of Australia
Taxa named by William Kirby (entomologist)